Contest  was an Australian sloop wrecked in 1807. She was a sloop of some 44 tons (bm), built in Port Jackson, New South Wales, by James Underwood, owned by Kable & Co, and registered on 20 July 1804. On 28 February 1807 she was sailing for Newcastle, New South Wales, but the wind would not allow her to make the harbour and so she continued north. A little short of Port Stephens, New South Wales, a heavy storm drove Contest ashore, where she was smashed to pieces. All the crew were saved but no cargo was salvageable.

References

Shipwrecks of the Hunter Region
Maritime incidents in 1807
1807 in Australia
1788–1850 ships of Australia
Merchant ships of Australia
History of New South Wales
Port Stephens Council
Sloops of Australia
Individual sailing vessels
1800s ships
Ships built in New South Wales